Tobin Jay Marks (born November 25, 1944) is the Vladimir N. Ipatieff Professor of Catalytic Chemistry, Professor of Material Science and Engineering, Professor of Chemical and Biological Engineering, and Professor of Applied Physics at Northwestern University in Evanston, Illinois. Among the themes of his research are synthetic organo-f-element and early-transition metal organometallic chemistry, polymer chemistry, materials chemistry, homogeneous and heterogeneous catalysis, molecule-based photonic materials, superconductivity, metal-organic chemical vapor deposition, and biological aspects of transition metal chemistry.

Marks received his B.S. from the University of Maryland in 1966 in chemistry, and his Ph.D. from the Massachusetts Institute of Technology in 1971 under the direction of F. A. Cotton. He came to Northwestern University in the fall of 1970.

The Marks Group

Historically the Marks group has been organized into four teams (A-D), reflecting the historical strengths and the needs of emerging technologies:
 A-team; Organometallics/Catalysis
 B-team: Molecular Photonics
 C-team: Transparent Oxides
 D-team: Molecular Electronics

Marks is known for his ability to tie his efforts to practical problems.  Work in organometallics/catalysis (A-team) has traditionally focused on two main areas: Group IV mediated polymerizations and f-element mediated hydroelementation.   His extensive work in polymerization catalysts and determination of mechanistic traits that allow for optimization, have made these materials and processes industrially relevant.

Awards

 
 
 
 
 
 
 
 
 
 
 
 
 
 
 
 
 
 
 
 
 
 
 
 
 
 
 
 
 
 
 
 
 
 
 
 
 
 
 
 
 
 
 
 
 
 
 
 
 
 
 
 
 
 
 
 
 
 
 
 
 
 
  from the Technion in Israel

References

External links
Marks group website
List of publications at isiknowledge.com
C&E News Article

21st-century American chemists
1944 births
Living people
Northwestern University faculty
National Medal of Science laureates
Members of the United States National Academy of Sciences
Members of the United States National Academy of Engineering
University of Maryland, College Park alumni